is a Japanese boxer. He competed in the men's bantamweight event at the 1960 Summer Olympics.

References

1938 births
Living people
Japanese male boxers
Olympic boxers of Japan
Boxers at the 1960 Summer Olympics
Sportspeople from Miyagi Prefecture
Bantamweight boxers